The 1969–70 Bulgarian Cup was the 30th season of the Bulgarian Cup (in this period the tournament was named Cup of the Soviet Army). Levski Sofia won the competition, beating CSKA Sofia 2–1 in the final at the Vasil Levski National Stadium.

First round

|}

1Sliven qualified by drawing lots.

Second round

|}

Quarter-finals

|}

Semi-finals

Final

Details

References

1969-70
1969–70 domestic association football cups
Cup